The Skulleton is an upcoming horror-thriller film directed by Ante Novakovic and written by Anthony and James Gaudioso.  It stars Bruce Dern, Tyrese Gibson,  Shawnee Smith and Taryn Manning.

Filming began in December 2022 in Connecticut, for a planned release in October 2023.

Premise
Moira Cole's life is shattered following the savage slaying of her loved ones by her unhinged and fixated cousin, Lee Morris. Together with her two grown sons, who are also profoundly impacted by the tragedy, now lives a simple and quiet suburban life. However, Moira is reminded of the painful memories every October as her story was optioned into a successful film series.

Cast
 Bruce Dern
 Tyrese Gibson as Detective Cyphers 
 Shawnee Smith as Moira Cole
 Taryn Manning
 Damian Maffei 
 Drew Moerlein
 Alexander James Rodriguez 
 Jaime Zevallos 
 Anthony Gaudioso
 James Gaudioso
 Jennifer King as Cindi

Production
In December 2022, it was reported that Ante Novakovic signed on to direct The Skulleton.  It was written by twins Anthony and James Gaudioso, who also produce and star in the film. Bruce Dern, Tyrese Gibson, Shawnee Smith and Taryn Manning were cast in lead roles.

Principal photography began in early December 2022 in West Hartford, Connecticut.  The city will serve as fictional Deep Ridge Falls for the film.

Release
The Skulleton is planned to be released in October 2023, in time for Halloween.

References

External links
 

 Upcoming films
 2020s American films
American thriller films
American horror films
American horror thriller films
Films shot in Connecticut